Transatlantic is a 1931 American pre-Code comedy film directed by William K. Howard and starring Edmund Lowe. It won an Academy Award for Best Art Direction by Gordon Wiles.

Cast
 Edmund Lowe as Monty Greer
 Lois Moran as Judy Kramer
 John Halliday as Henry D. Graham
 Greta Nissen as Sigrid Carline
 Myrna Loy as Kay Graham
 Jean Hersholt as Rudolph aka Jed Kramer
 Earle Foxe as Handsome
 Billy Bevan as Hodgkins
 Claude King as Captain

References

External links

1931 films
1931 comedy films
American comedy films
American black-and-white films
Films directed by William K. Howard
Films whose art director won the Best Art Direction Academy Award
Fox Film films
1930s English-language films
1930s American films